Sonia Benezra (born September 25, 1960 in Montreal, Quebec) is a Canadian TV and radio interviewer and personality and actress who formerly hosted shows on MusiquePlus, MusiMax, MuchMusic and MuchMoreMusic.  She hosted a daily live talk show on the French-language TQS television, also open to English-speaking  entertainment figures, for five seasons.

  Over 200 shows were produced per year, with more than 1 million viewers per show. Benezra worked as co-host (2008–2009) for English-language radio station CFQR (Q92) afternoon drive  show. She is involved in the "Walk for Breast Cancer" charities in and around the Island of Montreal.She is a clothing designer with her own line.

Benezra was born in Montreal, her mother from Morocco and her father from Spain. She was raised as a Jew.

References 

Actresses from Montreal
Living people
Canadian people of Moroccan-Jewish descent
Canadian people of Spanish descent
Jewish Canadian actresses
20th-century Sephardi Jews
21st-century Sephardi Jews
Canadian television talk show hosts
1960 births